The Gremyashchiy class, Russian designation Project 20385, is an update of the s of the Russian Navy. This follow-on project was designed by the Almaz Central Marine Design Bureau in Saint Petersburg. The first ship was laid down on 26 May 2011 and the official laying down ceremony took place on 1 February 2012. Although classified as corvettes by the Russian Navy, these ships carry sensors and weapon systems akin to frigates and, as a result, are so classified by NATO.

History
Gremyashchiy-class corvettes are very large multipurpose vessels, designed to complement the Steregushchiy class already being commissioned with the Russian Navy. They have been designed to have an improved habitability for higher endurance missions, and are able to launch cruise missiles.

The class was designed with German MTU diesels for propulsion. However, because of sanctions arising from the Ukrainian conflict, deliveries of MTU diesels beyond the first two units were stopped, resulting in the cancellation of further units. Instead, new units of the preceding Steregushchiy class are being ordered. In May 2016, corvette Gremyashchiy got two Russian-made 1DDA-12000 diesel units from Kolomna Works, based on their 16D49 engines, replacing the previously required German MTU diesels.

The lead vessel of the class, Gremyashchiy, went on sea trials in late April 2019. On 31 October 2019, Russian President Vladimir Putin announced Gremyashchiy will be equipped with the hypersonic 3M22 Zircon anti-ship cruise missiles. In December 2019, as part of its state acceptance trials, the ship entered White Sea to test its main missile system against various types of targets.

An additional order of two corvettes was made in August 2020. Since the order for the Project 20385 vessels was made in conjunction with a larger order for additional Project 20380 ships, the new vessels could be built either at the Amur Shipyard, if destined for the Pacific Fleet, or alteratively at Severnaya Verf. As of November 2020, the allocation between shipyards had still to be decided. In December it was announced that four new corvettes of the class would be built at the Amur Shipyard for the Pacific Fleet with service entry envisaged between 2024 and 2028.

In December 2021, Provornyy suffered severe fire damage while under construction at the Severnaya Verf yard. A rebuild was reported as likely to take five years.

Design
Project 20385 differs from its predecessor by greater dimensions and displacement. They have a steel hull and composite superstructure, with a bulbous bow and nine watertight subdivisions. Compared with the Soobrazitelny, Boikiy, Sovershennyy and Stoikiy ships, which are fitted with Redut air defense VLS system of 12 launchers on the bow, these new ships are equipped with a UKSK VLS system comprising eight launchers for either Kalibr, Oniks or Zircon anti-ship/cruise missiles. The Redut VLS system with 16 launchers has been placed on the stern. Another difference is the lack of the aft mast above the helicopter hangar, and single integrated mainmast that no longer includes separate open shelves for artillery and navigation radars.

Ships 

Italics indicate estimates

See also
List of ships of the Soviet Navy
List of ships of Russia by project number

References

External links
Project 20380/20385 - Complete Ship List

Corvettes of the Russian Navy
Corvette classes
Proposed ships